The LG Optimus Chic E720 is an entry-level, touch-screen smartphone manufactured by LG Electronics, Inc.

See also
 Comparison of smartphones
 Galaxy Nexus

References

External links

LG Electronics smartphones
Android (operating system) devices
Mobile phones introduced in 2010
Discontinued smartphones